Maria de Lurdes Mutola (born 27 October 1972) is a retired female track and field athlete from Mozambique who specialised in the 800 metres running event. She is only the fourth female track and field athlete to compete at six Olympic Games. She is a three-time world champion in this event and a one-time Olympic champion.

Although Mutola never broke the world record in her favourite event, she is regarded by many track insiders and fans as one of the greatest 800 metres female runners of all time due to her consistently good results in major championships and her exceptional longevity which saw her compete at the highest level for two decades before retiring from athletics in 2008 at the age of 35. She is also the only athlete ever to have won Olympic, World, World indoor, Commonwealth Games, Continental Games and Continental Championships titles in the same event.  She is also the main coach and mentor of Caster Semenya.

Career

Early years
Mutola was born in 1972 in the poor shanty town of Chamanculo on the outskirts of Maputo, then known as Lourenço Marques, the capital of Portuguese Mozambique. Her father was employed by the railways and her mother was a market vendor. As a young girl she excelled in football. She played with boys, as there were no leagues or teams for girls. In 1988, at only 15 years of age, she was encouraged to take up athletics by one of Mozambique's foremost literary figures, the poet José Craveirinha, who was a keen sports fan. His son Stelio, himself a former national long jump record holder who had competed in the 1980 Summer Olympics, was Mutola's first coach. Not used to the intensive training, Mutola initially decided that running was not for her, but was persuaded to continue when it became obvious that she had immense potential.

After a visit to Portugal, plans were made for her to join the Lisbon-based Benfica athletics club, but at the last minute Mozambican government denied her permission. That year, after only a few months' training, she won a silver medal in the 800 metres at the 1988 African Championships in Annaba, Algeria before competing in the 1988 Summer Olympics less than a month later. She ran a personal best time of 2:04.36, but only finished seventh in her first round heat, failing to progress to the semi-finals. Mutola was still only fifteen years old.

Studying and training in the United States
Over the next few years Mutola failed to improve on her best time, but still won gold at the African Championships in Cairo in 1990. She faced little opposition in Mozambique and only trained properly in the run-up to big competitions. Attempts were made to organise scholarships for her to train abroad, but it was not until 1991 that, thanks to an IOC solidarity programme, she was awarded a scholarship to go to the United States to study and train. Springfield High School in Oregon was her host school, due to the fact that there was a Portuguese-speaking staff member (since Mutola spoke no English).

She quickly surprised many by finishing fourth in the final of the 1991 World Championships in Tokyo, where her time of 1:57.63 constituted a world junior record. Mutola lost out on a medal because she was severely impeded, elbowed twice by Ella Kovacs as she tried to pass in the final few metres. On the finish line, Kovacs fell across the line ahead of Mutola, reaching out and tripping race winner Lilia Nurutdinova as well. A protest was lodged but it was unsuccessful. At the 1992 Summer Olympics in Barcelona there were great hopes for Mutola to win Mozambique's first Olympic medal. She ran strongly but faded badly in the home straight, eventually finishing fifth behind winner Ellen van Langen. At the same Olympics, Mutola ran one of the few 1500 m races at an international championship, placing ninth in the final. That same year she also won the 800 m event at the 1992 IAAF World Cup in Havana, and was the only woman to beat Ellen van Langen throughout the whole year.

Athletic domination

Over the next few years, Mutola dominated the 800 m event, winning the 800 m title at the 1993 and 1995 World Indoor Championships and the 1993 World Championships. At the latter event, held in Stuttgart, she won by over two seconds, the biggest ever winning margin in an international women's 800 m final. A favourite for the world outdoor title in 1995 as well, she was disqualified in her semi-final for stepping outside of her lane. Some consolation came at the Memorial Van Damme meeting in Brussels a few weeks after the World Championships, when she broke the world record for 1000 m with a time of 2:29.34, becoming the first woman ever to run the distance in less than two and a half minutes. She also went on to break the world indoor record for 1000 m.  She also went undefeated (3-0) vs that years World Champion Ana Quirot, including crushing Quirot at the season ending Grand Prix final where she finished 1st to Quirot's 5th.

Her immense success and her total domination of the event during this period can be attributed to the guidance that she has received since 1991 from Margo Jennings. Jennings was a track coach at Springfield High School and continued to coach Mutola, even when she had relocated from Oregon to Johannesburg to escape the high pollen count in Oregon. Jennings would fax Mutola's training schedules to her in South Africa, and has also coached other world class 800 m runners like Kelly Holmes, Namibian athlete Agnes Samaria and Tina Paulino, who is a distant relative of Mutola's.

At the 1996 Summer Olympics in Atlanta, Mutola was a hot favourite for the gold, as she hadn't been beaten in an 800 m final since 1992 and her winning streak stretched to over forty 800 m and 1000 m finals. However, suffering from flu, she ended up finishing third behind surprise winner Svetlana Masterkova and Ana Quirot. The Russians had also used team tactics with Masterkova's teammate and Britain's Kelly Holmes working to box in both Quirot and Mutola with Masterkova in front, leaving them too much ground to make up near the end. Later in 1996 Mutola lost her world 1000 m record to Masterkova in a hard-fought head-to-head duel.

Mutola was known as the complete package as an 800-metre runner. She had tremendous strength, and would turn in numerous impressive 1500 metres performances through her career. She had blazing speed, and a very strong finishing kick. She also was a smart and calculated tactical racer, who understood her competitors and their strengths and weaknesses well, and how to position herself throughout a race. She was comfortable running and winning races from either the front or the back. Most of all she had an unwavering determination to win, rarely ever matched in women's middle-distance running.

Status in 800 m race history

Mutola is often ranked as one of the greatest female 800 m runners of all time, and to some even the best. She has not gained a world record in the event, but her consistency, her performances at major championships and her ability to compete at the highest levels of the sport for two decades are unmatched – the 2008 Olympics were her sixth consecutive Olympics. She does however have a 0–4 record against her rival Ana Quirot in World and Olympic competition, and Quirot ran sub-1:55 twice vs. Mutola's career best of 1:55.16.  In terms of global championship gold medals however, Mutola bests Quirot in Olympic titles (1–0), outdoor World titles (3-2) and indoor World titles (7-0).   Mutola and Quirot are good friends to this day and often write one another, and Mutola often wrote Quirot letters of encouragement to return to Track and Field following her near fatal heavy burn explosion.

Mutola won bronze in the 1997 IAAF World Championships in Athletics and silver in 1999. She also won the IAAF World Indoor Championships in Athletics in 1997, only weeks after her father had been killed in a car accident. She raced wearing a black ribbon and dedicated the victory to his memory. In total she has won nine world 800 m titles, including both indoor and outdoor championships. She won the Commonwealth Games twice, after Mozambique was admitted to the Commonwealth in 1995, and has also won the IAAF World Cup event, representing the Africa team, four times consecutively.

Her greatest moment, though, came at the Sydney Olympics in 2000, when Mutola finally won Olympic gold. She beat her major rival Stephanie Graf and Kelly Holmes. She returned to Mozambique after her Olympic victory, huge crowds came to cheer her and a road was named after her in Maputo.

She continued her successes in the 2001 season, grabbing the world title in Edmonton and again in 2003 in Paris. It was widely felt that Mutola ran tactically during the 2003 race by setting a slow pace in order to aid her training partner Kelly Holmes. As a result of such a strategy Holmes was able to take silver. Mutola was unbeaten throughout 2003 and grabbed the headlines again that year, at the Memorial Van Damme race in Belgium. By winning here, it meant that she became sole winner of the 2003 IAAF Golden League one million dollar jackpot, awarded to athletes who remained undefeated in all six competitions in the season. She put part of her winnings towards the foundation that she had established in her name in Mozambique.

Aiming to become the first woman to successfully defend the Olympic 800 m title in 2004, her fifth Olympics, Mutola ended up finishing fourth. Despite carrying a hamstring injury, Mutola was in the gold medal position until the final few metres, when three athletes passed her, including the eventual champion, her former training partner Kelly Holmes. In 2005, her injuries were still lingering and she suffered several losses to opponents she would normally easily beat. Mutola finished fourth in the 800 m at the 2005 World Championships in Helsinki; third-place winner Tatyana Andrianova was retroactively suspended for a doping violation in 2015. A later test invalidated Andrianova's results from 9 August 2005 through 8 August 2007. On April 14, 2016 the Court of Arbitration for Sport (CAS) overturned Andrianova's two-year doping suspension because her sample had been re-tested beyond the eight-year statute of limitations. "As the eight-year statute of limitations had expired prior to January 1, 2015, the 10-year statute of limitations provided under the new 2015 anti-doping rules cannot apply," CAS said in a statement.

Mutola parted amicably with her coach Margo Jennings, before returning to good form in 2006, when she won the World Indoor Championships title for a record seventh time. At the 2007 IAAF World Championships, Mutola was in contention for a medal entering into the home straight, but pulled out of the race in the dying metres.

In 2008, the 800 metres African record held by Mutola, was beaten by the young Pamela Jelimo of Kenya. Mutola had decided that the 2008 Olympic Games would be her last major championships, and she finished fifth in the 800 metres Olympic final. She publicly called an end to her 21-year-long athletics career at the Weltklasse Zürich meeting immediately after the Olympics. She finished fourth with a run of 1:58.71 in the 800 m, again behind Jelimo, who completed a symbolic feat by beating Mutola's meet record which had stood since 1994.

Her appearance at the 2008 Olympics made her only the fourth female track and field athlete to compete at six Olympics, after Lia Manoliu (discus), Tessa Sanderson (javelin/heptathlon), and seven-time Olympian  Merlene Ottey (sprints).

Other work

She was appointed an honorary United Nations youth ambassador in 2003 at a ceremony in Maputo, in recognition of her outstanding athletic achievements. Other youth ambassadors are musician Baaba Maal and basketball star Dikembe Mutombo. She cited the importance of raising awareness of HIV/AIDS issues amongst young people in Africa and also highlighted the benefits that sport can bring to young people. Indeed, her Lurdes Mutola Foundation aims to bring more young Mozambicans to sport and to assist in helping them achieve their sporting and educational potential. Other initiatives that Mutola and her Foundation have been involved in include a Ministry of Health / UNICEF immunisation campaign against measles and polio and housing development initiatives in Maputo. Even before the establishment of the Foundation, she had played an active role in supporting sport in Maputo. She gave financial support that allowed an artificial track to be constructed on the sports ground at which she had originally trained as a fifteen-year-old. She also authorised the sale of T-shirts that featured her image, profits from which went towards helping the Grupo Desportivo de Maputo out of financial difficulty.

At the 2006 Winter Olympics she was one of the eight Olympic flag bearers at the Opening Ceremony.

After retiring from athletics she returned to her first sporting love, football. She played for Mamelodi Sundowns team in the South African women's league.  In 2011, she was captain of the Mozambique women's national football team at the All-Africa Games in Maputo.

In 2012, she coached South African runner Caster Semenya to a silver medal at the Olympic Games in London.

Achievements

International competitions

Personal bests

800 m honours
 Olympic Games: 1988 first round; 1992 5th and 9th 1500 m; 1996 3rd; 2000 1st; 2004 4th; 2008 5th
 World Championships: 1991 4th; 1993 1st; 1995 disqualified semi final; 1997 3rd; 1999 2nd; 2001 1st; 2003 1st, 2005 4th, 2007 Did not Finish Final
 World Indoor Championships: 1993 1st; 1995 1st; 1997 1st; 1999 2nd; 2001 1st; 2003 1st; 2004 1st; 2006 1st; 2007 3rd
 World Cup: 1992 1st and 3rd 4 × 400 m Relay; 1994 1st; 1998 1st; 2002 1st and 4th 4 × 400 m Relay
 All-Africa Games: 1991 1st; 1995 1st; 1999 1st
 African Championships: 1988 2nd; 1990 1st and 1st 1500 m; 1993 1st; 1998 1st; 2002 1st; 2006 2nd; 2008 2nd
 Commonwealth Games: 1998 1st; 2002 1st; 2006 3rd

Awards
 Track & Field News Athlete of the Year: 2003

See also
 List of athletes with the most appearances at Olympic Games

References

External links
 
 

1972 births
Living people
Sportspeople from Maputo
Mozambican female middle-distance runners
World record setters in athletics (track and field)
Athletes (track and field) at the 1988 Summer Olympics
Athletes (track and field) at the 1992 Summer Olympics
Athletes (track and field) at the 1996 Summer Olympics
Athletes (track and field) at the 2000 Summer Olympics
Athletes (track and field) at the 2004 Summer Olympics
Athletes (track and field) at the 2008 Summer Olympics
Athletes (track and field) at the 1998 Commonwealth Games
Athletes (track and field) at the 2002 Commonwealth Games
Athletes (track and field) at the 2006 Commonwealth Games
Olympic gold medalists for Mozambique
Olympic bronze medalists for Mozambique
Olympic athletes of Mozambique
Commonwealth Games gold medallists for Mozambique
Commonwealth Games bronze medallists for Mozambique
World Athletics Championships medalists
Medalists at the 2000 Summer Olympics
Mozambican women's footballers
Mozambique women's international footballers
Women's association football forwards
Medalists at the 1996 Summer Olympics
Olympic gold medalists in athletics (track and field)
Olympic bronze medalists in athletics (track and field)
Commonwealth Games medallists in athletics
African Games gold medalists for Mozambique
African Games medalists in athletics (track and field)
World Athletics indoor record holders
Goodwill Games medalists in athletics
IAAF Golden League winners
Track & Field News Athlete of the Year winners
Athletes (track and field) at the 1991 All-Africa Games
Athletes (track and field) at the 1995 All-Africa Games
Athletes (track and field) at the 1999 All-Africa Games
World Athletics Indoor Championships winners
World Athletics Championships winners
Competitors at the 1998 Goodwill Games
Competitors at the 2001 Goodwill Games
Competitors at the 1994 Goodwill Games
Goodwill Games gold medalists in athletics
Medallists at the 1998 Commonwealth Games
Medallists at the 2002 Commonwealth Games
Medallists at the 2006 Commonwealth Games